Soaappu Seeppu Kannadi is a 1968 Indian Tamil-language comedy film starring Nagesh and Vijaya Nirmala. It is produced by Karthikeya Films and directed by Thirumalai–Mahalingam. The film was released on 15 March 1968.

Plot 
Madhusudhanan, the eldest son of a rich respectable family, is compelled by his family members to get married. Unwilling to marry before getting an employment on his own, even though he does not require it due to his family background, he leaves his home to escape from the marriage torture. He gets into a train without a ticket and gets caught by a ticket checker. Along with him, another boy Sadha who is also from a rich family gets caught for the same reason and both are thrown off of the train. Both roam around the city until they rescue a man from drowning in the river while fishing. In return, he offers a salesman job to Madhu and driver job to Sadha in his cosmetic company. One of the man suggests to visit a home at Shennoy Nagar, where he can expect a good business order.

Latha is a college student and a daughter of a businessman in Shennoy Nagar. Latha's mother leaves to visit her relatives' home to plan for her daughter's marriage. Latha, her father and their cook have separate keys to the home for convenience. Madhu visits Shennoy Nagar, which is Latha's home to get an order. Latha's father, who does not know Madhu is inside the home, locks the house and leaves. Now Madhu is trapped inside a home at Shennoy Nagar. Sadha searches for him in and around Shennoy Nagar, but could not find him. Latha returns home and faints on seeing a stranger. Madhu convinces her by explaining his situation. Slowly, both develop an interest for each other become involved. Latha's father has to leave for Bombay and takes Latha to her aunt's house. Latha promises Madhu that she will return by midnight without her aunt's knowledge. Sadha, who searches for his friend, enquires about him to a group of robbers. He tells them that his friend has company's money with him. The robbers plan to loot the money.

Latha and the robbers come to the home at midnight. Madhu and Latha struggle to save the money from the thieves, but in vain. Madhu chases the robbers and passers-by mistake Madhu as thief and call 101 fire department instead of 100 to call police. People from fire department arrive and rush to put out the fire on seeing smoke, which is actually not fire smoke, but flour dust. The robbers are caught by the patrol police and the money is saved. After many confusions and explanations, Madhu understands that he actually arrived to the home of the girl whom his family wanted him to marry. Madhu agrees to get married on the account he has a job on his own, as per his wish.

Cast 
 Nagesh  as Madhusudhanan (Madhu)
 Vijaya Nirmala as Latha
S. V. Sahasranamam
A. Veerappan as Sadha
A. Karunanidhi as Cook
Typist Gopu
Usilai Mani
Karikol Raju
A. K. Veerasami
C. K. Saraswathi

Production 
The film was shot at Gobichettipalayam. A cow was borrowed for filming.

Soundtrack 
Soundtrack was composed by T. K. Ramamoorthy.

Reception 
Kalki appreciated the film for its comedy.

References

External links 
 

1960s Tamil-language films
1968 comedy films
1968 films
Indian comedy films